Kaarel Orviku (15 July 1935 in Tartu – 24 July 2021) was an Estonian geologist (marine geologist) and nature photographer. His scientific activity is mainly related to the coasts of Estonia.

In 1959 he graduated from Tartu State University. Since 1959 he was teaching at Tallinn University, earlier he taught at Tallinn University of Technology.

1993–2009 he worked at AS Merin which dealt with questions with coastal areas and environmental assessment.

His father was geologist Karl Orviku.

Awards
2001: Order of the White Star, V class.

References

1935 births
2021 deaths
Estonian geologists
Estonian photographers
Recipients of the Order of the White Star, 5th Class
University of Tartu alumni
Academic staff of Tallinn University
People from Tartu